Artemi Tchernenko (born 4 April 1978) is a Russian former professional tennis player.

On the ATP Tour, Tchernenko featured twice in the St. Petersburg Open main draw, losing first round matches to Nicolas Kiefer in 1996 and Marc Rosset in 1998. He was a doubles quarter-finalist at the 1998 tournament, with Ģirts Dzelde.

Tchernenko is married to politician and former Olympic speed skater Svetlana Zhurova.

References

External links
 
 

1978 births
Living people
Russian male tennis players